Cerconota siraphora is a moth of the family Depressariidae. It is found in Guyana, French Guiana, Brazil and Peru.

The wingspan is about 20 mm. The forewings are greyish-violet with the extreme costal edge whitish and with some violet-fuscous suffusion towards the dorsum about one-fourth. The plical and second discal stigmata are dark fuscous and there is a small cloudy violet-fuscous spot on the middle of the costa, where a strongly curved series of dark fuscous dots runs to the dorsum at two-thirds. There is a rather larger flattened-triangular violet-fuscous spot on the costa at three-fourths, where a series of dark fuscous dots runs to the dorsum before the tornus, indented beneath the costa and curved outwards in the disc. There is a terminal series of dark fuscous dots. The hindwings are grey, paler towards the base.

References

Moths described in 1915
Cerconota
Taxa named by Edward Meyrick